Operation Hydra may refer to:

 Operation Hydra (1943), a bombing of Peenemünde in World War II
 Operation Hydra (Yugoslavia), a 1942 SOE operation in Yugoslavia